Yeh Shin-cheng is a Taiwanese politician. He served as Minister without Portfolio of the Executive Yuan from 2014 to 2016. He was Deputy Minister of the Environmental Protection Administration from 2012 to 2014.

Education
Yeh obtained his bachelor's degree in civil engineering and master's degree in environmental engineering from National Taiwan University (NTU) in 1987 and 1992, respectively. He obtained his doctorate in water resources and environmental systems at Cornell University in the United States in 1996.

Early career
Yeh served as a postdoctoral research fellow at the Graduate Institute of Environmental Engineering of NTU in 1996-1997 and adjunct assistant professor in the same department in 1997–1998. Afterwards, he became an assistant professor of the Department of Civil Engineering at National Chi Nan University. In 2001–2006, he was an associate professor at the Graduate Institute of Environmental Education of National Kaohsiung Normal University, and was promoted to professor and director in 2006–2009. In 2009–2012, he was a professor of the Graduate Institute of Environmental Education of National Taiwan Normal University, where he was also promoted to be director in 2010.

References

Taiwanese Ministers of Environment
Living people
1965 births
Cornell University alumni
Academic staff of the National Chi Nan University